The Diamantina River is a major river located in Central West Queensland and the far north of South Australia.

The river was named by William Landsborough in 1866 for Lady Diamantina Bowen (née Roma), wife of Sir George Bowen, the first Governor of Queensland. It has three major tributaries the Western River, Mayne River and Farrars Creek.

Geography
In extremely wet years, the Warburton River flows as far as Lake Eyre.

Apart from a few streams near Winton (the largest town in the basin) almost all rivers in the basin flow southwestwards towards Birdsville. The Diamantina River has no main channel, rather it is a series of wide and relatively shallow channels. The major feature of the river's sluggish course is Diamantina National Park about halfway between Winton and Birdsville. Apart from the national park, almost all land in the basin is used for grazing cattle and sheep, though numbers fluctuate greatly and considerable skill is required on the part of graziers.

The variable drought and flood cycles of the area make the river ephemeral with many semi-permanent waterholes.

The Diamantina runs along the northern and eastern rim of a roughly circular zone measuring some 130 km across that has been identified by Geoscience Australia as a crustal anomaly. Proof is currently lacking as to the cause, but it is believed likely that the anomaly was caused by an asteroid strike that happened about 300 million years ago.

Environment

Climate
The climate of the basin is hot and arid.

Precipitation
However, the rainfall of the basin, as with all of the Lake Eyre Basin, is exceedingly erratic and catastrophic droughts and floods tend to be the normal state of affairs throughout this region.

In dry years such as 1902, 1905, 1928, 1961, 1965 and 2002, almost the whole basin reported totals .

Soils
The soils in the region are mainly grey and brown vertisols, with some fluvents in the drier areas. Although they do not have high phosphate contents, they have adequate levels of most other nutrients: consequently when rainfall is abundant the grasses within the basin are extremely nutritious, especially in the lower reaches of the river around Birdsville, which is a primary region for cattle fattening in years when rainfall further north is adequate to flood the region.

Wildlife
The  floodplain of the lower reaches of the Diamantina has been identified as an Important Bird Area by BirdLife International because it has been estimated to support at least 450,000 waterbirds when in flood, as well as globally significant numbers of the nankeen night-heron, royal spoonbill, little curlew, Australian bustard, grey grasswren, inland dotterel, cinnamon quail-thrush and pied honeyeater.

History
The river is ephemeral but floods periodically following heavy rainfall events in the catchment.

Karuwali (also known as Garuwali, Dieri) is a language of far western Queensland. The Karuwali language region includes the landscape within the local government boundaries of the Diamantina Shire Council, including the localities of Betoota and Haddon Corner.

See also

List of rivers of Australia
Diamantina River ring feature

References

Rivers of Queensland
Rivers of South Australia
Floodplains of Australia
Lake Eyre basin
Central West Queensland
Important Bird Areas of Queensland